Frenchtown is an unincorporated community in Crawford County, Pennsylvania, United States. It is located in East Mead Township on Pennsylvania Route 27, east of Meadville.

References

Unincorporated communities in Pennsylvania
Unincorporated communities in Crawford County, Pennsylvania